Tamarro (named after a mythological creature in local culture) is a genus of troodontid theropod from the Late Cretaceous Talarn Formation (Tremp Group) of Spain. The genus contains a single species, Tamarro insperatus, known from a partial metatarsal described in 2021.

Discovery and naming 
The holotype of Tamarro, MCD-7073, a metatarsal, was found in 2003 at the Sant Romà d'Abella site, belonging to the Talarn Formation of the Tremp Group. In 2021, Sellés et al. described it as a new genus and species, Tamarro insperatus; the generic name is that of a small creature in the folklore of Pallars, Spain, while the specific name means "unexpected", referring to the unexpected discovery of the fossil.

Classification 
Sellés et al. placed Tamarro in the Jinfengopteryginae, making it the first member of the subfamily from Europe. They also suggested that its ancestors migrated from Asia to Europe sometime between the Cenomanian and the Maastrichtian.

Paleobiology 
Analysis of the holotype suggests it was a subadult; its large size suggests it grew quickly early in its life.

Paleoecology 
Tamarro lived on the Ibero-Armorican Island, and its discovery increases knowledge about the diversity of small theropods on the Cretaceous European archipelago. It would have lived at the same time as dwarf sauropods and lambeosaurine hadrosaurs.

References 

Troodontids
Fossil taxa described in 2021
Cretaceous Spain
Cretaceous dinosaurs of Europe
Monotypic dinosaur genera